Adamos Adamou (born 30 October 1950, in Limassol) is a Cypriot politician and former Member of the European Parliament (MEP) for the Progressive Party of Working People, sitting with the European United Left–Nordic Green Left group from 2004 to 2009. He sat on the European Parliament's Committee on the Environment, Public Health and Food Safety. He did not stand for reelection in the 2009 European elections.

Adamou was deputy director of Pathological Oncology Clinic.

Biography
He is the Chairman of the Delegations for relations between EU with the Palestinian Legislative Council. As a chairman, he is a member of the Conference of Delegation Chairmen. 
Became (Dec 2009) Patron of The Friends' Hospice Paphos, a charitable organisation established in 2006, attached to the Evangelismos hospital in Paphos, Cyprus.

He is also a substitute of the Committee on Culture and Education and of the Delegation to the EU-Chile Joint Parliamentary Committee.

Education
 1976: Graduate in medicine (Athens)
 2001: specialised in pathology (1982) and pathological oncology

Career
 1976–79: Doctor with the Hellenic Anticancer Society
 1979–84: Specialist doctor and pathologist at Pathology Clinic I of the Hellenic Red Cross Hospital
 1984–85: Lecturer and deputy director of Pathological Oncology Clinic I of the Agioi Anargyroi Hospital (Athens)
 1988–98: Deputy director of the Clinical Oncology Department of Nicosia General Hospital
 from 2004: Consultant Oncologist at the Bank of Cyprus Oncology Centre (1998–2003) and at the Medical 'Prevention' Centre
 from 2003: ΑΚΕL-Left – New Powers Member
 Member of the parliamentary Health, Environmental, European Affairs and Audit Committees
 from 1998: Representative of Cyprus in the European Society for Medical Oncology (ESMO)
 Member of the Cyprus Medical Association and chairman of its Bioethics Committee
 Member of the Cyprus Anticancer Association and chairman of its information committee
 Chairman of the Scientific Committee of the Karaiskakio Foundation
 Honourable mention from the Hellenic Breast Cancer Research Society
 Honourable mention and plaque from the Hellenic Psychosocial Oncology Society

See also

 
2004 European Parliament election in Cyprus

References

1950 births
Cypriot pathologists
Cypriot socialists
Greek Cypriot people
Living people
Cypriot oncologists
People from Limassol
Progressive Party of Working People MEPs
MEPs for Cyprus 2004–2009
21st-century Cypriot politicians